Bonanza Pass, also known as the Blueberry-Paulson, is a mountain pass in the Monashee Mountains of British Columbia, Canada.  It is utilized by the Crowsnest Highway to traverse the Monashees, and informally separates the Kootenays to the east from the Boundary Country to the west.

External links
BCGN data

West Kootenay
Boundary Country
Mountain passes of British Columbia
Monashee Mountains